Manvita Kamath is an Indian actress who works in Kannada cinema. She started her career as a Radio Jockey in Radio Mirchi and made a switch to acting through the Kannada film Kendasampige (2015) directed by Duniya Soori.

Early life
Manvita Kamath, earlier known as Manvita Harish aka Shwetha Kamath, was born to Harish Kamath and Sujatha Kamath on 13 April in Mangalore. She was brought up in Kalasa of Chikmagalur till SSLC, later pursued her PU and Degree in Sharada PU college and graduated in Journalism, Animation and English literature from St. Aloysius College Mangalore. She worked for more than a year in Radio Mirchi, Mangalore prior and was hosting a show named Khiladi 983.

Career
Even though she did not have any connections in the industry, a contact recommended her name to Duniya Soori. She was called for the auditions of Kendasampige and got selected for the lead role. Apart from her acting skills, she had two qualities that Duniya Soori was looking for in his leading lady – the ability to drive long distances and know Kannada thoroughly. In fact, Manvita Harish was well versed with Mangalore Kannada, Malnad Kannada, Dharwad Kannada and Bengaluru Kannada, which became an advantage. Manvita Harish was in theaters since childhood in the folk drama troupe of Late Mr.Bhaskar Nelliteertha. She was also the secretary of Kannada Sangha in college that made her take film as her career. She was paired opposite Vikky Varun in the film as Gowri Shetty, that went on to become a success commercially. Her next work was the commercial hit movie Tagaru, directed by Duniya Soori paired with Hatrick Hero Shiva Rajkumar.

Filmography

Television

Awards and honours

References

External links

 
 

Actresses from Mangalore
Actresses in Kannada cinema
Living people
Indian film actresses
Kannada actresses
21st-century Indian actresses
South Indian International Movie Awards winners
1992 births